Darrehchi may refer to:
 Darrehchi, East Azerbaijan
 Darrehchi, Lorestan